Thucydides generally refers to Thucydides, son of Olorus, (circa 460-before 394 BC) aGreek historian. It may also refer to:

 10137 Thucydides, a main-belt asteroid
 Thucydides, son of Melesias (5th century BC), prominent politician of ancient Athens
 Thucydides II, son of Melesias II (4th century), grandson of Thucydides, son of Melesias featured in Plato's Laches
Thucydides Trap, where a rising power causes fear in an established power which escalates toward war